DGamer (Disney Gamer) was an online game and social network service developed by Disney for use with Nintendo DS games. DGamer was accessible via the Nintendo Wi-Fi Connection or computer via the DGamer Channel on Disney.com. The service was implemented by Fall Line Studios and Disney Interactive Studios.

It launched in North America on May 15, 2008, coinciding with the release of the DS version of The Chronicles of Narnia: Prince Caspian. DGamer's Wi-Fi connections were retired on March 15, 2013. It can still be used via local wireless connections, but is no longer able to connect to the Nintendo Wi-Fi Connection service.

Supported games

The Chronicles of Narnia: Prince Caspian
WALL-E
Spectrobes: Beyond the Portals
Ultimate Band
The Cheetah Girls: Passport to Stardom
Club Penguin: Elite Penguin Force
Club Penguin: Elite Penguin Force: Herbert's Revenge
Tinker Bell
Bolt
High School Musical 3: Senior Year
Phineas and Ferb
Hannah Montana: The Movie
Up
G-Force
Wizards Of Waverly Place
JONAS
Tinker Bell and the Lost Treasure
Cars Race-O-Rama
A Christmas Carol
The Princess and the Frog 
Sonny with a Chance
Alice in Wonderland
Disney Stitch Jam
Camp Rock 2: The Final Jam
Phineas and Ferb: Ride Again
Tinker Bell and the Great Fairy Rescue
Tron: Evolution
Wizards of Waverly Place: Spellbound
Tangled: The Video Game
Toy Story 3
The Suite Life of Zack & Cody: Circle of Spies
The Sorcerer's Apprentice

References

External links
Official website

Video game culture
Online video game services
Defunct social networking services
Disney technology